PCP Torpedo is a 6" vinyl EP by American grindcore band Agoraphobic Nosebleed. It was released in 1998 on Hydra Head Records. PCP Torpedo was pressed on assorted colours, including black, black/red mixed, red, and orange/red mixed. The opening sample on "Thanksgiving Day" is Richard Pryor as Zeke Brown in the film Blue Collar.

Track listing

PCP Torpedo/ANbRx reissue

PCP Torpedo/ANbRx is a 2-CD set that contains the re-release of the out of print PCP Torpedo 6". The second disc, ANbRx, consists of remixes of songs from PCP Torpedo. Among notable contributors are Merzbow, Vidna Obmana, James Plotkin and Justin Broadrick.

Much like the Altered States of America album, both discs contain hidden tracks: "Azido Phencyclidine Electrophoresis" on disc one and "Submachine Drum (Agoraphonic Nosecandy mix)" on disc two, both of which are accessible by rewinding the first track.

Track listing

References 

1998 albums
Agoraphobic Nosebleed albums
Hydra Head Records albums
Albums with cover art by Aaron Turner
2006 remix albums
2006 compilation albums
Hydra Head Records compilation albums
Hydra Head Records remix albums